Gayatri Devi Trivedi is an Indian politician from Indian National Congress and member of the Rajasthan Legislative Assembly. She is widow of Late Kailash Chandra Trivedi, former MLA Sahara. She was elected as an MLA from Sahara Constituency in 2021 bypolls.

References

External links 
 
 

Living people
Rajasthani politicians
Indian National Congress politicians
1957 births
Rajasthan MLAs 2018–2023
Indian National Congress politicians from Rajasthan